Maurice Wilhelm, Duke of Saxe-Merseburg  (5 February 1688 – 21 April 1731) was a duke of Saxe-Merseburg and member of the House of Wettin.

He was born in Merseburg, the fifth (but second surviving) son of Christian II, Duke of Saxe-Merseburg, and Erdmuthe Dorothea of Saxe-Zeitz.

Life
Maurice Wilhelm succeeded his older brother Christian III Maurice, Duke of Saxe-Merseburg, when he died on 14 November 1694 after only twenty-five days of rule. As he was only six years of age at the time, his mother, the dowager duchess Erdmuthe Dorothea, acted as regent until he reached his majority in 1712.  Until then, the administration of the duchy was supervised by the Elector Frederick Augustus I of Saxony. The custody of the young duke, whoever, was actually in the hands of the dowager duchess Erdmuthe Dorothea, who took an interest in the government of the duchy until 1709, and his uncle August, Duke of Saxe-Merseburg-Zörbig.

An enthusiastic violinist, he was known as the "Geigenherzog" (the violinist duke).

Marriage and issue
In Idstein on 4 November 1711, Maurice Wilhelm married Henriette Charlotte of Nassau-Idstein.  They only had one daughter:

Fredericka Ulrike (b. and d. Merseburg, 23 June 1720).

After his death at Merseburg, without male issue, he was succeeded by his uncle Heinrich.

Notes

References 
 Christoph Henzel: Zur Merseburger Hofmusik unter Herzog Moritz Wilhelm. In: Mitteldeutschland im musikalischen Glanz seiner Residenzen – Sachsen, Böhmen und Schlesien als Musiklandschaften im 16. und 17. Jahrhundert, Peter Wollny (ed.), Beeskow, 2005, pp. 95–105

1688 births
1731 deaths
House of Saxe-Merseburg
Dukes of Saxe-Merseburg
People from Merseburg
Albertine branch
Recipients of the Order of the White Eagle (Poland)